Peter Shann Ford is an Australian CEO, bionics software developer, author and former journalist and news anchor.

He is the founder of Control Bionics, a neural systems technology company, and the inventor of NeuroSwitch, an EMG (electromyograph) based communications and control system for people with profound disabilities including Locked in Syndrome.

Career
Australian-born Ford was a news anchor with CNN and CNN2 (aka HLN ) in the United States, when he also became a programmer/analyst with the new US Veterans Administration Rehabilitation R&D Laboratory in Atlanta where he coded communication technology for people with severe disabilities.

He continued developing advanced Assistive Technology (AT) programs, firstly using single key inputs, then coding movement sensors on the body to enable a person with paralysis or quadriplegia to control a computer for text, text-to-speech and online communications. This was achieved while Ford worked as a news anchor at WTVJ, the NBC affiliate in Miami, and then with WRC-TV, NBC's owned-and-operated station in Washington DC, where he covered the Space Shuttle and manned flight programs at Kennedy and Johnson Space Centers, and reporting on assignment from Moscow, the Vatican, the Gulf War, the Pentagon and The White House.

After the September 11 attacks, Ford reported for NBC from Islamabad and the North-West Frontier Province of Pakistan, before being embedded with his team with mujahideen at Tora Bora, where coalition forces were hunting Osama bin Laden.

In 1999, he created ESRA (Echidna Signal Recognition and Analysis), a system for using the body's own neuroelectric (EMG - electromyography) signals to control a computer.  Working with James Schorey, CEO of Therapeutic Alliances, he developed this into NeuroSwitch, designed to help people with quadriplegia, motor neurone disease, spinal cord injuries or traumatic brain injury to regain communication through a computer, iPhone or iPad.

In 2000 Simon & Schuster, New York, published his novel, The Keeper of Dreams, set in the Anangu Pitjantjatjara Yankunytjatjara Aboriginal lands of Australia's Central Deserts and the technology centres engaged in the first survey missions to Mars. It has been reprinted on Amazon as "Dreaming Country"  along with the novella "Graffiti".

In 2002 Professor Stephen Hawking invited Peter to Cambridge to demonstrate his communication technology, and they met regularly over the next seven years to assess its evolution.  In 2003 Prof. Hawking asked to have a prototype of the system installed on his powered wheelchair for trial during a lecture visit at Texas A&M University Physics Department (photo).

In 2005, with a founding investment from Lindsay Phillips's Phoenix Development Fund in Sydney, he incorporated Control Bionics PL, to develop advanced AT employing a disabled person's EMG to communicate with text, computer-generated-speech, emails, and the internet, and control personal robots, beginning with Anybots in Palo Alto in the Silicon Valley.  A year later, they launched Control Bionics Inc. in the USA and established a design and manufacturing base in Ohio.

NeuroNode is the latest edition, a wireless, wearable, wristwatch-sized EMG and spatial switch enabling people with disabilities to regain communication with their families, carers, and the world.  Control Bionics Xelerator (CBX) the company's R&D lab is developing advanced neuroelectric controls for robotics, gaming and VR/AR/MR virtual environments.

He is a graduate of 1OTU Scheyville, and completed National Service with 3RAR.

Honours and awards
In 2018 he represented Control Bionics to win the first Pitch@Palace Commonwealth award in London, in a field of 42 nations.

Ford is a winner of the National Disability Award 2015 for Excellence in Accessible Technology for NeuroSwitch

He is a former New South Wales Senior Australian of the Year.

He is a Life Member of Mensa.

References

External links
 ABC "Australian Story"
 "Conversations with Richard Fidler"
"CommBank Interview"
 "The Australian"
 "The Project"
 "Seven Network Television"

Australian computer programmers
Living people
Australian television presenters
Television anchors from Washington, D.C.
Year of birth missing (living people)